The Bangor Bangors was the final moniker of the minor league baseball teams based in Bangor, Pennsylvania in 1907, 1949 and 1950.  Bangor teams played as members of the 1907 Blue Mountain League and the Class D level North Atlantic League in 1949 and 1950.

History
Bangor first hosted minor league baseball in 1907 as members of the Independent level Blue Mountain League. The final league standings are unknown.

Minor league baseball returned to Bangor in 1949, when the Bangor Pickers became members of the eight–team Class D level North Atlantic League. On August 8, 1949  Bangor had a 44–55 record when the franchise transferred to Berwick, Pennsylvania, possibly due to flooding in Bangor. With a 59–75 overall record, the Bangor/Berwick team placed 6th in the North Atlantic League standings. Managed by Bill Long, the Pickers finished 40.5 games behind the 1st place Stroudsburg Poconos in the final regular season standings.

Bangor/Berwick player Joe Campinha, formerly of the Baltimore Elite Giants, is recognized as breaking the color barrier in the North Atlantic League, playing catcher for the 1949 Bangor/Berwick Pickers, while hitting .269.

In 1950, the Bangor Bangors resumed play as members of the North Atlantic League. Berwick also continued play in the eight–team league, hosting the Berwick Slaters. In their final season of play, Bangor finished the regular season with a record of 65–71. The Bangors placed 6th while drawing 15,302 at Bangor Stadium. Playing under manager Al Gardella, the Bangors finished their final season 23.5 games behind the 1st place Lebanon Chix. Player/manager Al Gardella managed his brother Danny Gardella on the 1950 Bangors. After the conclusion of the 1950 season, the North Atlantic League permanently folded after the final two seasons of North Atlantic League saw overall league attendance drop from to just over 242,000 in 1949 to 175,000 in 1950.

Bangor, Pennsylvania has not hosted another minor league team.

The ballpark
Bangor teams were noted to have played minor league home games at Bangor Stadium in 1949 and 1950. Located within Bangor Borough Memorial Park, the ballpark had a capacity of 2,500 in 1949 and 2,800 in 1950. The ballpark address was 37 Broadway. Today, the park is called Bangor Veterans Memorial Park and remains a public park with ballfields and other amenities. The location is 197 Broadway, Bangor, Pennsylvania.

Timeline

Year–by–year records

Notable alumni

Joe Campinha (1949)
Al Gardella (1950, MGR)
Danny Gardella (1950)

References

External links
Baseball Reference

Defunct baseball teams in Pennsylvania
Baseball teams established in 1950
Baseball teams disestablished in 1950
Northampton County, Pennsylvania
North Atlantic League teams